Sathria internitalis is a moth in the family Crambidae. It is found in Haiti, the Dominican Republic, Cuba and Florida.

References

Moths described in 1854
Spilomelinae